Heinz Oberhummer was an Austrian physicist and skeptic.

Biography 
Heinz Oberhummer was born in Bischofshofen and grew up in Obertauern, Austria. He studied physics at the University of Graz and the Ludwig Maximilian University of Munich.
He  lived in the village of Oberwölbling in the Dunkelsteinerwald, Lower Austria. Heinz Oberhummer was married and had two children.

Research fields 
Heinz Oberhummer was professor emeritus of Theoretical Physics at the Atominstitut of the Vienna University of Technology.
His main research area was nucleosynthesis.  He was also involved in questions concerning the fine-tuning of the Universe.
Oberhummer, Csótó und Schlattl were able to derive quantifiable results concerning the fine-tuning of the Universe by investigating the creation of carbon and oxygen in the triple-alpha process
in red giants.

He was the initiator of "Nuclei in the Cosmos", the most important international conference series in the field of nuclear astrophysics taking place for the tenth time in the year 2008 at Michigan State University in the United States.

He was especially engaged in the popularisation of scientific contents, including the new media. He developed Web-based learning and information systems and co-ordinated educational projects funded by the
European Commission, such as Cinema and Science.

He was member of the Scientific Advisory Board of the Giordano Bruno Foundation and the Gesellschaft zur wissenschaftlichen Untersuchung von Parawissenschaften (GWUP), the German-speaking branch of the worldwide skeptical movement. Furthermore, he was president of the "Gesellschaft für Kritisches Denken" (the Austrian branch of the GWUP), and of the Austrian "Zentralrat für Konfessionsfreie" (National Council of Non-confessionals. Heinz Oberhummer was president of the secularist initiative "Religion ist Privatsache" (Religion is a private matter). He died in Vienna on 23 November 2015.

Oberhummer Award

After Oberhummer's death, the Heinz Oberhummer Award for Science Communication was established in his honor.

Oberhummer Award winners receive a glass of alpaca droppings and 20.000 euros.

Recipients

References

Selected publications 
 Kann das alles Zufall sein – Geheimnisvolles Universum?, Ecowin-Verlag, Salzburg, 2008, 
 H. Oberhummer: Urknall und Sternenstaub – Der Kosmos aus naturwissenschaftlicher Sicht In Die Idee vom Anfang, Ritter Verlag, Klagenfurt, Wién, 2008, 
 H. Oberhummer: Maßarbeit oder Zufall – sind wir nicht anderes als Sternenstaub? In Der etwas andere Blick auf die Schöpfung, Haag + Herrchen: Frankfurt, 2007, 
 H. Oberhummer (Editor): Nuclei in the Cosmos, Graduate Texts in Contemporary Physics, Springer Verlag, Heidelberg, 1991, 
 H. Oberhummer, A. Patkos, T. Rauscher: Origin of the Chemical Elements. In: Handbook of Nuclear Chemistry, Vol. 2, Kap. 1, Kluwer, 2003, 
 H. Oberhummer, A. Csótó, H. Schlattl: Stellar production rates of carbon and its abundance in the Universe, Science 289, 2000, 88
 H. Oberhummer: Kerne und Sterne: Einführung in die Nukleare Astrophysik. In German. Barth,  Leipzig, Berlin, Heidelberg 1993,

External links 
 Articles of Heinz Oberhummer in arxiv.org
 Kann das alles Zufall sein? – Geheimnisvolles Universum, Ecowin-Verlag, 2008; Award for "Best Popular Science Book in Austria 2009"
 Science Busters
 Cinema and Science (CISCI)
 Neue Erkenntnisse zur Entstehung der Grundlagen für Leben

1941 births
2015 deaths
People from Bischofshofen
Austrian physicists
20th-century Austrian astronomers
Austrian skeptics
Austrian male writers
University of Graz alumni
Ludwig Maximilian University of Munich alumni
Academic staff of TU Wien
21st-century Austrian astronomers